The China Railways ET7 class of locomotives were a series of 90 0-8-0T machines for industrial use built by Fablok of Poland.

History
90 locomotives were built and exported to China between 1959 and 1961 for use on industrial sites, including steelworks. Many units were still in work in the 1980s and some of the machines remained in use until the 1990s.

ET7-5333 is preserved at Baotou Museum.

References

External links
See also T2D Śląsk (Polish)

Fablok locomotives
Steam locomotives of China
0-8-0T locomotives
Standard gauge locomotives of China
Railway locomotives introduced in 1959

Shunting locomotives